Ihor Serhiiovych Trunov (born 10 May 1992) is a Ukrainian sprint canoeist. He is 2021 World Champion and bronze medallist of the 2022 World Championships.

Sporting career
At the 2013 Summer Universiade he won silver in K-4 200 m. He is European Championships medalist.

At the 2017 European championships in Plovdiv, Bulgaria, he finished third in pair with Ivan Semykin in K-2 500 m. But in November 2017, Trunov received a four-year suspension following a positive drug in-competition test taken in May 2017. He was therefore stripped of the silver medal he won at the 2017 European championships. He returned to competitions after his ban ended and became 2021 World champion in the K–4 500 m event (together with Oleh Kukharyk, Dmytro Danylenko, and Ivan Semykin).

References

External links

Ukrainian male canoeists
Living people
People from Kamianske
1992 births
European Games competitors for Ukraine
Canoeists at the 2015 European Games
Universiade medalists in canoeing
Universiade silver medalists for Ukraine
Medalists at the 2013 Summer Universiade
ICF Canoe Sprint World Championships medalists in kayak
Ukrainian sportspeople in doping cases
Sportspeople from Dnipropetrovsk Oblast
21st-century Ukrainian people